Michael Lee Oates (born August 29, 1957) is a retired United States Army lieutenant general from San Antonio, Texas. He was commissioned in the Infantry upon graduation from the United States Military Academy in 1979.

Military career
Oates was promoted to lieutenant general on 30 December 2009 and assumed duties as Director, Joint Improvised Explosive Device Defeat Organization.

Oates was born in West Germany and raised in San Antonio, Texas. He is a 1975 graduate of TMI Episcopal. His wife Barbara is from San Angelo, Texas and they have three daughters; Katherine, Elizabeth and Margaret. Oates’ previous assignment was as Commanding General of the 10th Mountain Division (Light Infantry) and Fort Drum and as Commanding General, Multi-National Division (SOUTH), in Iraq.

Oates was commissioned as an infantry officer following his graduation from the United States Military Academy at West Point, New York in 1979. His initial duty assignments included service with the 2nd Battalion, 7th Cavalry, 1st Cavalry Division at Fort Hood, Texas and the 2d Battalion, 187th Infantry (Airborne), Republic of Panama. Subsequent tactical assignments included service with the 3rd Brigade, 101st Airborne Division (Air Assault) at Fort Campbell, Kentucky, and as Commander, 1st Battalion, 22d Infantry, 10th Mountain Division at Fort Drum, New York. Oates later commanded the 1st Brigade, 101st Airborne Division (Air Assault) from 1998 to 2000 and commanded the 10th Mountain Division (Light) from 2007 to 2009.

Oates' non-tactical assignments include service as an Infantry Assignments Officer; Current Operations Officer in the J3, Joint Staff; Executive Officer to Tom White, Secretary of the Army; and as Chief of Staff to Lieutenant General Keith Kellogg, the Chief Operations Officer, Coalition Provisional Authority, Baghdad, Iraq.

Oates holds a master's degree in National Security and Strategic Studies from the United States Naval War College, Newport, Rhode Island. He is a graduate of the Army's Command and General Staff College.

Awards and decorations

References

External links

 Past commanders page, Michael L. Oates, 1st Battalion 22nd Infantry web site, accessed December 17, 2011

1957 births
Living people
TMI Episcopal alumni
United States Military Academy alumni
Military personnel from San Antonio
United States Army Rangers
United States Army Command and General Staff College alumni
Naval War College alumni
Recipients of the Legion of Merit
United States Army generals
Recipients of the Distinguished Service Medal (US Army)